Norma Levor Barzman (born September 15, 1920) is an American screenwriter, actress and writer who has been active in the film industry since the Golden Age of Hollywood.

Life and career 
Barzman was born on September 15, 1920 in New York City, New York. She started her career in 1946 writing the original story for Never Say Goodbye and The Locket. Later, she also write Finishing School (1952) and Il triangolo rosso (1967).

Barzman also appeared as an actress in Theatre 70 (1970) and Pajama Party (2000) as the Groovy Grandma guest.

Personal life 
Barzman married mathematician Claude Shannon, known as the "father of information theory", and lived with him in Princeton, New Jersey. When they divorced, Barzman moved to Los Angeles with her mother and took classes at the School for Writers, the members of which were leftist. She met and married screenwriter Ben Barzman. Between the years 1949 and 1976 they lived in London, Paris, and Mougins (France), having been blacklisted from Hollywood. They had seven children. She resides in Beverly Hills, California.

Filmography

Writer 
 Il triangolo rosso (1967)
 Finishing School (1952)
 The Locket (1946)
 Never Say Goodbye (1946)

Actress 
 Pajama Party (2000) - Groovy Grandma guest
 Theatre 70 (1960) - Narrator

Documentary 
 Les exilés d'Hollywood (2006)
 Imaginary Witness: Hollywood and the Holocaust (2004)

Books 
 The End of Romance: A Memoir of Love, Sex, and the Mystery of the Violin (2006)
 The Red and the Blacklist: The Intimate Memoir of a Hollywood Expatriate (2002)
 Rich Dreams (1982)

References 

1920 births
Living people
American women screenwriters
20th-century American screenwriters
20th-century American actresses
People from New York City
People from Beverly Hills, California
20th-century American women writers
American centenarians